Western Nevada College (WNC) is a public college with its main campus in Carson City, Nevada and additional campuses in Fallon and Minden. There are also WNC  centers in Dayton, Fernley, Hawthorne, Lake Tahoe, Lovelock, Smith Valley and Yerington, as well as degree programs in five correctional institutions. The college offers a number of different associate degrees, certificate programs and a bachelor of technology degree.

Prior to July 2007, WNC was known as Western Nevada Community College. The name change was approved by the Nevada System of Higher Education Board of Regents in recognition of WNC's ability to grant niche four-year degrees. It is accredited by the Northwest Commission on Colleges and Universities.

External links
 

1971 establishments in Nevada
Buildings and structures in Carson City, Nevada
Education in Carson City, Nevada
Education in Churchill County, Nevada
Education in Douglas County, Nevada
Educational institutions established in 1971
Nevada System of Higher Education
NJCAA athletics
Universities and colleges accredited by the Northwest Commission on Colleges and Universities
Public universities and colleges in Nevada